Suru is a Local Government Area in Kebbi State, Nigeria. Its headquarters is in the town of Dakingari. Suru was created in 1991 out of Bunza LGA, which lies to the north and east. The major ethnic groups include Fulani, Hausa and Zarma with scattered small villages around the LGA.

It has an area of 1,352 km and a population of 150,230 at the 2006 census.

The postal code of the area is 862.

References

Local Government Areas in Kebbi State